The Spiegelbach is a river in the southern Palatinate.  It arises as a diversion of the Queich, which rises in the Palatinate forest, and thus has no separate source.  It flows into the Rhine at Sondernheim.

After a devastating flood in 1745, in which the mills on the Altbach and Brühlgraben were flooded, it was decided to create a diversion from the Queich towards Bellheim, in order to provide the newly built mills with a steady supply of water.  From the weir on the boundary of the districts Ottersheim and Knittelsheim, the Spiegelbach flows  before reaching the Old Rhine at Sondernheim.

See also 
List of rivers of Rhineland-Palatinate

Rivers of Rhineland-Palatinate
Rivers of Germany